Živa may refer to:

Živa (mythology), fertility and love goddess in Slavic mythology
Živa (Vajska), small settlement near Vajska, Serbia
Živa (journal), journal founded by Jan Evangelista Purkyně